William Odis Bertelsman (born January 31, 1936) is a senior United States district judge of the United States District Court for the Eastern District of Kentucky.

Education and career

Born in Cincinnati, Ohio, Bertelsman received an Artium Baccalaureus degree from Xavier University of Ohio in 1958, and a Juris Doctor from the University of Cincinnati College of Law in 1961. He was in private practice in Newport, Kentucky from 1962 to 1979, also serving as a Captain in the United States Army from 1963 to 1964. He was a lecturer for the University of Cincinnati College of Law from 1965 to 1972, and an adjunct professor of law at the Salmon P. Chase College of Law at Northern Kentucky University beginning in 1989.

Federal judicial service

On October 11, 1979, Bertelsman was nominated by President Jimmy Carter to a new seat on the United States District Court for the Eastern District of Kentucky created by 92 Stat. 1629. He was confirmed by the United States Senate on November 26, 1979, and received his commission the next day. He served as Chief Judge from 1991 to 1998, assuming senior status on February 1, 2001.

Notable cases

Bertelsman provided the Opinion for the case Jones v. Dirty World Entertainment Recordings LLC.

Bertelsman is the assigned judge in the Sandmann v. Washington Post lawsuit.

References

Sources
 

1936 births
Living people
Judges of the United States District Court for the Eastern District of Kentucky
United States district court judges appointed by Jimmy Carter
20th-century American judges
Xavier University alumni
University of Cincinnati College of Law alumni
United States Army officers
Salmon P. Chase College of Law faculty
University of Cincinnati College of Law faculty
Kentucky lawyers
21st-century American judges